Dorothy Comstock Riley (December 6, 1924 – October 23, 2004) was a lawyer and judge from the U.S. state of Michigan, serving on the Michigan Supreme Court and the first woman to serve on the Michigan Court of Appeals. She was the first Hispanic woman to be elected to the Supreme Court of any state.

Life and career
Riley was born in Detroit, where she attended public schools, graduating from Northwestern High School. She attended Wayne State University, where she earned a B.A. in 1946. She received an LL.B. degree from Wayne State University Law School in 1949. Female lawyers were not common at the time and reportedly, when she interviewed at several law firms after graduation, the qualification they were most interested in was her typing ability. Instead of working at such firms, she began her own practice in the Detroit area.

In 1972, Riley became a Wayne County Circuit Judge and in 1976, she became the first woman to serve on the Michigan Court of Appeals. She ran for the Supreme Court in 1982 and lost. On December 9, 1982, Republican Governor William Milliken nevertheless appointed Riley to the Court to fill the vacancy caused by the death of Justice Blair Moody Jr. on November 26. This appointment became the subject of a bitter partisan controversy. Not only had Riley been rejected by the voters, but Milliken was also leaving office in less than a month, and newly elected Democratic Governor James Blanchard argued he should be allowed to make the appointment to replace Moody rather than Milliken.

In February 1983, the other Supreme Court Justices voted 4-2 to remove Riley from the court. Blanchard replaced her with U.S. District Court Judge Patricia Boyle. However, Riley won election to the Supreme Court in 1984 and was re-elected in 1992. She served as chief justice from 1987 to 1991. She retired from the Court on September 1, 1997 due to the onset of Parkinson's disease.

Riley had been a partner in the law firm of Riley and Roumell and was also the founder and Honorary Chair of the Michigan Supreme Court Historical Society. In 1991 she was inducted into the Michigan Women's Hall of Fame, and the State Bar of Michigan presented Riley with its Distinguished Public Servant Award in 2000.

Riley married Wallace D. Riley, a former President of the American Bar Association in 1967. They had one son, Peter Comstock Riley.

She died in Grosse Pointe Farms, aged 79.

See also
List of Hispanic/Latino American jurists
List of first women lawyers and judges in Michigan

References

1924 births
2004 deaths
People with Parkinson's disease
Lawyers from Detroit
Wayne State University alumni
Wayne State University Law School alumni
Michigan state court judges
Justices of the Michigan Supreme Court
Michigan Court of Appeals judges
20th-century American judges
20th-century American lawyers
20th-century American women lawyers
20th-century American women judges
21st-century American women
Hispanic and Latino American judges